Akshar Árbol International School is a Pre-K to 12th grade International School in Chennai.  R Subramanian, a chartered accountant in Chennai, is the founder of the school and Padmini Sankaran, is currently its head. The school has two campuses: one in West Mambalam and the other in the growing South Eastern suburb Neelankarai. The school's curriculum draws on both the International Baccalaureate and Cambridge International Examinations.

References

External links
 
 

Cambridge schools in India
International Baccalaureate schools in India
Primary schools in Tamil Nadu
High schools and secondary schools in Tamil Nadu
Schools in Chennai
Educational institutions in India with year of establishment missing